The Canadian federal budget for fiscal year 1980-1981 was presented by Minister of Finance Allan MacEachen in the House of Commons of Canada on 28 October 1980. It was the first budget presented after the Liberals won a majority in the 1980 Canadian federal election.

Details of the budget

Taxes 
The budget did not bring major changes to either personal income taxes or corporate income taxes as it mainly focused on the presentation of the National Energy Program. The budget maintained the indexing of income tax tables, costing 1.58 billions in 1981 alone.

The budget did however :
 Made the payment of travelling allowances a non-taxable benefit for part-time employees working at least  from their ordinary work location and residence ;
 Made Energy Conversion Grants a taxable benefit ;
 Extended the Small Business Development Bonds program for three months (until 31 March 1981 ; 
 Re-introduced incentives for the construction of multiple-unit residential buildings (MURB) until the end of 1981 ;
 Extended the special CCA class for railway tracks at 4% until the end of 1982.

Expenditures 
The budget announced an increase in 13.2% of expenditures over the fiscal year 1979-80 due partly to increase oil prices and increase in public debt charges. Expenditure especially increased in energy programs (+300%) and economic development (+22%) with a special $350 millions enveloppe for industrial restructuring and manpower retraining.

Reactions

External links 
 Budget in Brief

References 
 Budget Plan

 Budget Papers

 Other references

Canadian budgets
1980 in Canadian law
1980 government budgets
1980 in Canadian politics